Dual specificity protein phosphatase 3 is an enzyme that in humans is encoded by the DUSP3 gene.

The protein encoded by this gene is a member of the dual specificity protein phosphatase subfamily. These phosphatases inactivate their target kinases by dephosphorylating both the phosphoserine/threonine and phosphotyrosine residues. They negatively regulate members of the mitogen-activated protein (MAP) kinase superfamily (MAPK/ERK, SAPK/JNK, p38), which are associated with cellular proliferation and differentiation. Different members of the family of dual specificity phosphatases show distinct substrate specificities for various MAP kinases, different tissue distribution and subcellular localization, and different modes of inducibility of their expression by extracellular stimuli. This gene maps in a region that contains the BRCA1 locus which confers susceptibility to breast and ovarian cancer. Although DUSP3 is expressed in both breast and ovarian tissues, mutation screening in breast cancer pedigrees and in sporadic tumors was negative, leading to the conclusion that this gene is not BRCA1.

Model organisms

Model organisms have been used in the study of DUSP3 function. A conditional knockout mouse line, called Dusp3tm1a(KOMP)Wtsi was generated as part of the International Knockout Mouse Consortium program — a high-throughput mutagenesis project to generate and distribute animal models of disease to interested scientists.

Male and female animals underwent a standardized phenotypic screen to determine the effects of deletion. Twenty five tests were carried out on mutant mice and four significant abnormalities were observed. Homozygous mutants had an increased percent of body fat, abnormal humerus morphology and an increased susceptibility to bacterial infection. Corpus callosum area, hippocampus area and total brain section area was increased, while length of pyramidal cell layer was reduced.

Interactions
DUSP3 has been shown to interact with MAPK3 and MAPK1.

References

Further reading

Genes mutated in mice
EC 3.1.3